The Championnat National U17 is the highest tier of under-17 football in France. Organized by the French Football Federation, it is contested by 84 clubs that are split into 6 groups.

History 
In 2009, the U18 youth championship of France was split into two age groups; the Championnat National U19, which would replace the U18 league, and the Championnat National U17, a new league for this age category. Before this separation, a U16 league existed from 2002 to 2009 and a U15 league from 1990 to 2002. Therefore, the Championnat National U17 became the continuation for these now-disappeared competitions.

Format 
The Championnat National U17 is an annual competition that is contested by 84 clubs, with 83 coming from France and 1 from Monaco. The teams are distributed into 6 geographically-determined groups of 14 teams. A season starts in the end of summer and ends the following the spring. In the league phase, each team plays each other twice (home and away) in their respective groups for a total of 26 matches played per team. Afterwards, the 6 first-place teams in addition to the 2 best second-place teams face off in a play-off phase. The winner of the final is crowned French under-17 champion.

Clubs

2021–22 season 
For the 2021–22 season, 84 clubs participated in the Championnat National U17.

Performances by club 
Lyon have won the most titles, with four. The title was not awarded for the 2019–20 and 2020–21 seasons due to the COVID-19 pandemic, and no competition was held for the 1994–95 season.

See also 
 Championnat National U19

References

External links 

 Website

Football leagues in France
Under-17 association football
Youth football leagues in Europe
1990 establishments in France
Sports leagues established in 1990

fr:Championnat National U17#Championnat U17